Oreochromis andersonii, the three-spotted tilapia, threespot tilapia, or threespot bream,  is a species of cichlid native to Africa, where it is found in rivers and swamps in the southern half of the continent. It is important to local commercial fisheries, as well as being commercially farmed. It is also popular as a gamefish. The identity of the person honoured in the specific name of this fish is not known but it is though most likely to be the Swedish explorer and hunter Charles John Andersson (1827-1867) who explored much of Namibia where the type was collected.

References

andersonii
Freshwater fish of Central Africa
Fish described in 1861